Wynand Malan (born 25 May 1943) is a liberal Afrikaner South African politician.

A lawyer, Malan entered politics in the 1977 South African election when he was elected to the South Africa's all white parliament as the National Party MP for Randburg.

A member of the NP's reform wing, he was critical of P.W. Botha for being too timid in his constitutional reforms in the 1980s and was also critical of the state of emergency implemented by Botha. In the 1987 general election, he left the NP and ran as one of three independent candidates along with former ambassador to London Dennis Worrall and businesswoman Susan Lategan. He was the only one of the trio elected, probably because he was the only incumbent. He subsequently quarreled with Worrall and so the two formed two separate political parties after the election. In early 1989 these two new parties joined up with the veteran Progressive Federal Party to form the Democratic Party, which won a record number of seats for a liberal party in the September 1989 whites-only election. He subsequently became one of three co-leaders of the new party and retained his parliamentary seat in the 1989 general election by defeating former Ambassador to Canada Glenn Babb who was running for the NP. Malan remained in the DP's leadership until 1993.

From 1995 to 1998, Malan was a Commissioner of the Truth and Reconciliation Commission, which was chaired by Archbishop Desmond Tutu.

References

1943 births
White South African anti-apartheid activists
Afrikaner people
Living people
National Party (South Africa) politicians
Independent Party (South Africa) politicians
Democratic Party (South Africa) politicians
Members of the House of Assembly (South Africa)